.ye is the Internet country code top-level domain (ccTLD) for the Republic of Yemen.

History
In 2015, when the Houthis took over the Yemeni capital, the rebel forces also took over the main internet provider and distributor of the .ye domain. In response, the Aden-based Yemeni government created its own domain extension, .adennet. According to DomainTools, 1152 .ye domain names were registered as of 2018.

.YE regulations 
In order to register a .YE domain, you must have a company registered in Yemen. However, some registrars provide a local presence service for non-Yemeni clients. Domain names also need to be hosted in the Republic of Yemen.

Second level domains

There are eight Second Level Domains:
 com.ye: Commercial Entities 
 co.ye: Companies 
 ltd.ye: Limited Companies
 me.ye: Private Individuals 
 net.ye: Network Providers
 org.ye: Non-commercial Organizations 
 plc.ye: Public Companies
 gov.ye: Government and Governmental System

Second top domain
A second top domain will be used for the Republic of Yemen, intended for domain names in the local language. The string اليمن (al-Yaman) was registered and approved for this purpose in March 2011, but it was not activated and lower level domains were not granted at that time.

References

External links
 IANA .ye whois information

Country code top-level domains
Communications in Yemen

sv:Toppdomän#Y